Erzsébet Vass (née Metzker; 20 March 1915 – 8 August 1980) was a Hungarian politician, who served as Speaker of the National Assembly of Hungary between 1963 and 1967. She was the first woman who held this position in Hungary.

References
 Istvánné Vass Biography by Judit Villám

1915 births
1980 deaths
Women members of the National Assembly of Hungary
Speakers of the National Assembly of Hungary
Members of the Hungarian Socialist Workers' Party
20th-century Hungarian women politicians